Dalston is a civil parish in the Carlisle district of Cumbria, England.  It contains 93 buildings that are recorded in the National Heritage List for England.  Of these, three are listed at Grade I, the highest of the three grades, four are at Grade II*, the middle grade, and the others are at Grade II, the lowest grade.  The parish contains the village of Dalston and smaller scattered settlements, including Stockdalewath, Raughton Head, Cumdivock, Cardew, Hawkesdale, Buckabank, and Gaitsgill, but is mainly rural.  The most important building in the parish is Rose Castle, a fortified house that later became the residence of the bishops of Carlisle.  Most of the listed buildings are houses and associated structures, farmhouses and farm buildings.  The other listed buildings include churches, bridges, public houses, a boundary stone, a former threshing mill, a former workhouse, a village hall, two war memorials, and a commemorative seat.


Key

Buildings

Notes and references

Notes

Citations

Sources

Lists of listed buildings in Cumbria
Listed buildings in